Miculești may refer to several villages in Romania:

 Miculești, a village in the town of Pucioasa, Dâmbovița County
 Miculești, a village in Slivilești Commune, Gorj County

See also 
 Micești (disambiguation)